Chuck Bradley may refer to:

 Chuck Bradley (tight end) (born 1950), American football player
 Chuck Bradley (offensive tackle) (born 1970), American football player

See also
 Charles Bradley (disambiguation)